MFK Slovan Sabinov is a Slovak football team, based in the town of Sabinov.

Players

Current squad
As of 30 July 2021.

External links 
at sabinov.sk

References

Slovan Sabinov